Ane Miren Martínez de Lahidalga Beltrán de Guevara (born 5 September 1992) is a Spanish footballer who plays as a midfielder for Alavés.

Club career
Martínez started her career at Aurrera Vitoria.

International goals

References

External links
Profile at La Liga

1992 births
Living people
Women's association football midfielders
Spanish women's footballers
Sportspeople from Álava
Footballers from the Basque Country (autonomous community)
Deportivo Alavés Gloriosas players
Primera División (women) players
Segunda Federación (women) players